Antilope is a genus of twisted-horn bovid that contains a single living species, the blackbuck of South Asia. Two extinct species are also known.

Many fossil antelopes were included in this genus, but have since been placed in new genera; for example the species formerly known as Antilope planicornis is now placed in its own genus, Nisidorcas.

References

Taxa named by Peter Simon Pallas
True antelopes
Mammal genera
Mammal genera with one living species